"Scarlet Letters" is the seventh track and third single released from the album, The New Game, by American band Mudvayne. It was released only as a radio single.

Personnel 
 Chad Gray − vocals 
 Greg Tribbett − guitars, background vocals 
 Ryan Martinie − bass 
 Matthew McDonough − drums 
 Dave Fortman − producer, mixing

Charts

External links 

[]

References 

2009 singles
Mudvayne songs
2008 songs
Epic Records singles
Songs written by Chad Gray
Songs written by Ryan Martinie
Songs written by Matthew McDonough
Songs written by Greg Tribbett